Blanco (white or blank in Spanish) or Los Blancos may refer to:

People
Blanco (surname)

Fictional characters
Blanco, a hobbit in J. R. R. Tolkien's Middle-earth
Blanco Webb, character in the BBC sitcom Porridge
El Blanco, albino graboid from the Tremor movie and television series

Places

United States
Blanco, California (disambiguation), multiple places with the name
Blanco, Ohio, an unincorporated community
Blanco, Oklahoma, an unincorporated community
Blanco, New Mexico, in San Juan County
Blanco, Texas, a city
Blanco County, Texas
Mount Blanco, Texas
Blanco Canyon, Texas
Blanco Creek, Texas

Other countries
Los Blancos, Salta, Argentina
Blanco, Dominican Republic, a district in the Hermanas Mirabal province, Dominican Republic
Blanco, Western Cape, in South Africa

Multiple places
Blanco River (disambiguation), places with that name
Cabo Blanco (disambiguation), places with that name
Cape Blanco (disambiguation), places with that name
Río Blanco (disambiguation), places with that name

Music
Blanco y Negro Records, British record company
Ruido Blanco, album by Argentine band Soda Stereo
"Blanco", a 2009 song by Pitbull, released as the lead single from the Fast & Furious soundtrack
"Blanco" (J Balvin song), a 2019 song by J Balvin from Colores (2020)
Blanco (British rapper), British rapper, born 1999
Blanco (singer), Italian singer and rapper, born 2003

Food and drink
Queso blanco, Mexican cheese
Blanco, a type of tequila

Sports
Los Blancos, nickname of Real Madrid C.F.
Los Blancos, nickname of Real Jaén
Los Blancos, nickname of Atlético Grau

Other uses
Blanco 1, a nearby open cluster of stars
Blanco (compound), Joseph Pickering & Sons Ltd, military uniform cleaning paste

See also
Branco (disambiguation), the Portuguese equivalent
Blanca (disambiguation)